In Aztec mythology, Tonacatecuhtli was a creator and fertility god, worshipped for peopling the earth and making it fruitful. Most Colonial-era manuscripts equate him with Ōmetēcuhtli. His consort was Tonacacihuatl.

Tonacateuchtli is depicted in the Codex Borgia.

Etymology
While  is generally translated "lord",  presents several possible interpretations. By this etymology,  would mean "Lord of Our Food" or "Lord of Our Flesh", most commonly rendered "Lord of Our Sustenance." The word  simply means "abundance", giving  the alternate reading "Lord of Abundance".

Origin and role
Tōnacātēcuhtli was the Central Mexican form of the aged creator god common to Mesoamerican religion. According to the Codex Ríos, the History of the Mexicans as Told by Their Paintings, the Histoyre du Mechique, and the Florentine Codex, Tōnacātēcuhtli and his consort Tōnacācihuātl resided in "in Tōnacātēuctli īchān" ("the mansion of the Lord of Abundance"), also known as Omeyocan, the 13th, highest heaven, from which human souls descended to earth. Tōnacātēcuhtli is associated with procreation, appearing in pre-Columbian art near copulating humans. In the Florentine Codex, Sahagún relates that Aztec midwives would tell newborns after bathing them, "You were created in the place of duality, the place above the nine heavens. Your father and mother—Ōmetēuctli and Ōmecihuātl, the heavenly woman—formed you, created you."

In terms of the Aztec calendar, Tōnacātēcuhtli was the patron of Cipactli, the first of the twenty days in a month, as well as presiding over the trecena (thirteen-day ritual week) named 1 Cipactli (itself the first of the trecenas).

In the Codex Chimalpopoca, Tōnacātēcuhtli and Tōnacācihuātl are listed as one of several pairs of gods to whom Quetzalcoatl prays.

He turned the goddess Quaxolotl into a dog when she offended him.

Notes

References
 

 

Aztec gods
Creator gods
Fertility gods